Femina Miss India 2018 was the 55th edition of the Femina Miss India beauty pageant which was held on 19 June 2018 at Sardar Vallabhbhai Patel Indoor Stadium, Mumbai. Manushi Chhillar of Haryana crowned Anukreethy Vas of Tamil Nadu as her successor. She represented India at Miss World 2018.

Results 
Color keys

Background 
There are four zones/regions under which the contestants are grouped - North, South, East and West. There is one mentor for each Zone:
 North Zone - Neha Dhupia (Femina Miss India 2002)
 South Zone - Rakul Preet Singh (Femina Miss India 2011 - 3rd Runner up)
 East Zone - Pooja Chopra (Miss World India 2009)
 West Zone - Pooja Hegde (Miss Universe India 2010 - 2nd Runner up)

Judges
 Manushi Chhillar - Miss World 2017
 K. L. Rahul - Indian cricketer
 Irfan Pathan - Indian cricketer
 Kunal Kapoor - Indian actor and writer
 Malaika Arora - Indian actress, model, VJ and television presenter
 Gaurav Gupta - Indian Fashion Designer
 Faye D'Souza - Indian journalist

Sub Title Awards

Bennett University Sports Day

Chisel Miss Active

Senco Gold Miss Shining Star

Naturals Salon Miss Refreshing Beauty

Triumph Miss Body Beautiful

Rajnigandha Pearls Miss Beautiful Smile

fbb Miss Fashion Icon

Contestants
The following is the list of the official delegates of Miss India 2018 representing 30 states of the country:
Color key

Notes

References

External links
 

2018
2018 beauty pageants